Arborotites is a genus of fly in the family Ulidiidae.

Species
Arborotites stuckenbergi Enderlein, 1921

Distribution
South Africa.

References

Ulidiidae
Monotypic Brachycera genera
Endemic fauna of South Africa
Diptera of Africa
Brachycera genera